Hockey Club Thurgau is a Swiss professional ice hockey club based in Weinfelden, Switzerland. The club was founded in 1989 and currently plays in the Swiss League (SL) at the Güttingersreuti, with a capacity of 3,200.

History
HC Thurgau emerged from the merging of clubs EHC Frauenfeld and EHC Weinfelden. With the best players of the two ice hockey clubs, both located in Canton Thurgau, were to play as HC Thurgau. With the ideal to offer hockey fans a better regional ice hockey team to compete in the national league, the club was founded in 1989. In December 1993, the EHC Kreuzlingen also merged to join HC Thurgau.

The club started its first season in 1989–90 in the Swiss 1. Liga, the third highest ice hockey league in Switzerland. Two years later, with a 8–7 finals victory against SC Langnau, Thurgau claimed its first amateur title and was promoted to the National League B.

Players

Notable alumni
Mike Posma, 1993–1997
Rolf Schrepfer, 1993–1997, 2008–2009
Sylvain Turgeon, 2001–2002
Harijs Vītoliņš, 2001–2005
Marc Savard, 2004 
Damien Brunner, 2008
Todd Elik, 2009
Brandon Hagel, 2020

References

External links
 Official Website

Ice hockey teams in Switzerland
Thurgau
Weinfelden